In mathematics, a Diophantine equation is an equation, typically a polynomial equation in two or more unknowns with integer coefficients, such that the only solutions of interest are the integer ones. A linear Diophantine equation equates to a constant the sum of two or more monomials, each of degree one.  An exponential Diophantine equation is one in which unknowns can appear in exponents.

Diophantine problems have fewer equations than unknowns and involve finding integers that solve simultaneously all equations. As such systems of equations define algebraic curves, algebraic surfaces, or, more generally, algebraic sets, their study is a part of algebraic geometry that is called Diophantine geometry.

The word Diophantine refers to the Hellenistic mathematician of the 3rd century, Diophantus of Alexandria, who made a study of such equations and was one of the first mathematicians to introduce symbolism into algebra. The mathematical study of Diophantine problems that Diophantus initiated is now called Diophantine analysis.

While individual equations present a kind of puzzle and have been considered throughout history, the formulation of general theories of Diophantine equations (beyond the case of linear and quadratic equations) was an achievement of the twentieth century.

Examples

Linear Diophantine equations

One equation
The simplest linear Diophantine equation takes the form 
 
The solutions are described by the following theorem:

Proof: If  is this greatest common divisor, Bézout's identity asserts the existence of integers  and  such that .
 
showing that  is another solution. Finally, given two solutions such that 
 
one deduces that  
 
Therefore, 

which completes the proof.

Chinese remainder theorem

The Chinese remainder theorem describes an important class of linear Diophantine systems of equations: let  be  pairwise coprime integers greater than one,  be  arbitrary integers, and  be the product  The Chinese remainder theorem asserts that the following linear Diophantine system has exactly one solution  such that , and that the other solutions are obtained by adding to  a multiple of :

System of linear Diophantine equations
More generally, every system of linear Diophantine equations may be solved by computing the Smith normal form of its matrix, in a way that is similar to the use of the reduced row echelon form to solve a system of linear equations over a field. Using matrix notation every system of linear Diophantine equations may be written

is such that  is not zero for  not greater than some integer , and all the other entries are zero. The system to be solved may thus be rewritten as

This system is equivalent to the given one in the following sense: A column matrix of integers  is a solution of the given system if and only if  for some column matrix of integers  such that .

If this condition is fulfilled, the solutions of the given system are

where  are arbitrary integers.

Hermite normal form may also be used for solving systems of linear Diophantine equations. However, Hermite normal form does not directly provide the solutions; to get the solutions from the Hermite normal form, one has to successively solve several linear equations. Nevertheless, Richard Zippel wrote that the Smith normal form "is somewhat more than is actually needed to solve linear diophantine equations. Instead of reducing the equation to diagonal form, we only need to make it triangular, which is called the Hermite normal form. The Hermite normal form is substantially easier to compute than the Smith normal form."

Integer linear programming amounts to finding some integer solutions (optimal in some sense) of linear systems that include also inequations.  Thus systems of linear Diophantine equations are basic in this context, and textbooks on integer programming usually have a treatment of systems of linear Diophantine equations.

Homogeneous equations
A homogeneous Diophantine equation is a Diophantine equation that is defined by a homogeneous polynomial. A typical such equation is the equation of Fermat's Last Theorem

As a homogeneous polynomial in  indeterminates defines a hypersurface in the projective space of dimension , solving a homogeneous Diophantine equation is the same as finding the rational points of a projective hypersurface.

Solving a homogeneous Diophantine equation is generally a very difficult problem, even in the simplest non-trivial case of three indeterminates (in the case of two indeterminates the problem is equivalent with testing if a rational number is the th power of another rational number).

For degrees higher than three, most known results are theorems asserting that there are no solutions (for example Fermat's Last Theorem) or that the number of solutions is finite (for example Falting's theorem). 

For the degree three, there are general solving methods, which work on almost all equations that are encountered in practice, but no algorithm is known that works for every cubic equation.

Degree two
Homogeneous Diophantine equations of degree two are easier to solve. The standard solving method proceeds in two steps. One has first to find one solution, or to prove that there is no solution. When a solution has been found, all solutions are then deduced.

For proving that there is no solution, one may reduce the equation modulo . For example, the Diophantine equation

does not have any other solution than the trivial solution . The squares modulo 4 are congruent to 0 and 1. Thus the left-hand side of the equation is congruent to 0, 1, or 2, and the right-hand side is congruent to 0 or 3. Thus the only solution is the trivial solution . This shows that there is no rational point on a circle of radius  centered at the origin.

More generally, the Hasse principle allows deciding whether a homogeneous Diophantine equation of degree two has an integer solution, and computing a solution if there exist. 

If a non-trivial integer solution is known, one may produce all other solutions in the following way.

Geometric interpretation
Let 

be a homogeneous Diophantine equation, where  is a quadratic form (that is, a homogeneous polynomial of degree 2), with integer coefficients. The trivial solution is the solution where all  are zero. Conversely, if   are homogeneous coordinates of a rational point of this hypersurface, where  are integers, then  is an integer solution of the Diophantine equation. Moreover, the integer solutions that define a given rational point are all sequences of the form 

It follows that solving the Diophantine equation  is completely reduced to finding the rational points of the corresponding projective hypersurface.

Parameterization

Let now  be an integer solution of the equation  As  is a polynomial of degree two, a line passing through  crosses the hypersurface at a single other point, which is rational if and only if the line is rational (that is, if the line is defined by rational parameters). This allows parameterizing the hypersurface by the lines passing through , and the rational points are the those that are obtained from rational lines, that is, those that correspond to rational values of the parameters.

More precisely, one may proceed as follows. 

By permuting the indices, one may suppose, without loss of generality that  Then one may pass to the affine case by considering the affine hypersurface defined by 

which has the rational point

The change of variables 

does not change the rational points, and transforms  into a homogeneous polynomial in  variables. In this case, the problem may thus be solved by applying the method to an equation with fewer variables.

If the polynomial  is a product of linear polynomials (possibly with non-rational coefficients), then it defines two hyperplanes. The intersection of these hyperplanes is a rational flat, and contains rational singular points. This case is thus a special instance of the preceding case.

In the general case, let consider the parametric equation of a line passing through :

where  are polynomials of degree at most two with integer coefficients.

Then, one can return to the homogeneous case.

be the homogenization of  These quadratic polynomials with integer coefficients form a parameterization of the projective hypersurface defined by :

Thus, one may suppose that  are coprime integers.

Unfortunately this is not the case, as shown in the next section.

Example of Pythagorean triples
The equation 

is probably the first homogeneous Diophantine equation of degree two that has been studied. Its solutions are the Pythagorean triples. This is also the homogeneous equation of the unit circle. In this section, we show how the above method allows retrieving Euclid's formula for generating Pythagorean triples.

For retrieving exactly Euclid's formula, we start from the solution , corresponding to the point  of the unit circle. A line passing through this point may be parameterized by its slope:

Putting this in the circle equation 

one gets 

which is easy to solve in :

It follows

Homogenizing as described above one gets all solutions as 

Diophantine analysis

Typical questions 

The questions asked in Diophantine analysis include:

Are there any solutions?
Are there any solutions beyond some that are easily found by inspection?
Are there finitely or infinitely many solutions?
Can all solutions be found in theory?
Can one in practice compute a full list of solutions?

These traditional problems often lay unsolved for centuries, and mathematicians gradually came to understand their depth (in some cases), rather than treat them as puzzles.

Typical problem 
The given information is that a father's age is 1 less than twice that of his son, and that the digits  making up the father's age are reversed in the son's age (i.e. ). This leads to the equation , thus .

Many well known puzzles in the field of recreational mathematics lead to diophantine equations.  Examples include the cannonball problem, Archimedes's cattle problem and the monkey and the coconuts.

17th and 18th centuries
In 1637, Pierre de Fermat scribbled on the margin of his copy of Arithmetica: "It is impossible to separate a cube into two cubes, or a fourth power into two fourth powers, or in general, any power higher than the second into two like powers." Stated in more modern language, "The equation  has no solutions for any  higher than 2." Following this, he wrote: "I have discovered a truly marvelous proof of this proposition, which this margin is too narrow to contain." Such a proof eluded mathematicians for centuries, however, and as such his statement became famous as Fermat's Last Theorem. It was not until 1995 that it was proven by the British mathematician Andrew Wiles.

In 1657, Fermat attempted to solve the Diophantine equation  (solved by Brahmagupta over 1000 years earlier). The equation was eventually solved by Euler in the early 18th century, who also solved a number of other Diophantine equations.

Hilbert's tenth problem

In 1900, David Hilbert proposed the solvability of all Diophantine equations as the tenth of his fundamental problems. In 1970, Yuri Matiyasevich solved it negatively, building on work of Julia Robinson, Martin Davis, and Hilary Putnam to prove that a general algorithm for solving all Diophantine equations cannot exist.

Diophantine geometry
Diophantine geometry, which is the application of techniques from algebraic geometry in this field, has continued to grow as a result; since treating arbitrary equations is a dead end, attention turns to equations that also have a geometric meaning. The central idea of Diophantine geometry is that of a rational point, namely a solution to a polynomial equation or a system of polynomial equations, which is a vector in a prescribed field , when  is not  algebraically closed.

Modern research
One of the few general approaches is through the Hasse principle. Infinite descent is the traditional method, and has been pushed a long way.

The depth of the study of general Diophantine equations is shown by the characterisation of Diophantine sets as equivalently described as recursively enumerable. In other words, the general problem of Diophantine analysis is blessed or cursed with universality, and in any case is not something that will be solved except by re-expressing it in other terms.

The field of Diophantine approximation deals with the cases of Diophantine inequalities. Here variables are still supposed to be integral, but some coefficients may be irrational numbers, and the equality sign is replaced by upper and lower bounds.

The single most celebrated question in the field, the conjecture known as Fermat's Last Theorem, was solved by Andrew Wiles, using tools from algebraic geometry developed during the last century rather than within number theory where the conjecture was originally formulated. Other major results, such as Faltings's theorem, have disposed of old conjectures.

Infinite Diophantine equations
An example of an infinite diophantine equation is:

which can be expressed as "How many ways can a given integer  be written as the sum of a square plus twice a square plus thrice a square and so on?" The number of ways this can be done for each  forms an integer sequence. Infinite Diophantine equations are related to theta functions and infinite dimensional lattices. This equation always has a solution for any positive . Compare this to:

which does not always have a solution for positive .

Exponential Diophantine equations
If a Diophantine equation has as an additional variable or variables occurring as exponents, it is an exponential Diophantine equation. Examples include the Ramanujan–Nagell equation, and the equation of the Fermat–Catalan conjecture and Beal's conjecture,  with inequality restrictions on the exponents. A general theory for such equations is not available; particular cases such as Catalan's conjecture have been tackled. However, the majority are solved via ad hoc methods such as Størmer's theorem or even trial and error.

See also
 Kuṭṭaka, Aryabhata's algorithm for solving linear Diophantine equations in two unknowns

Notes

References

Further reading

Bashmakova, Izabella G. Diophantus and Diophantine Equations. Moscow: Nauka 1972 [in Russian]. German translation: Diophant und diophantische Gleichungen. Birkhauser, Basel/ Stuttgart, 1974. English translation: Diophantus and Diophantine Equations. Translated by Abe Shenitzer with the editorial assistance of Hardy Grant and updated by Joseph Silverman. The Dolciani Mathematical Expositions, 20. Mathematical Association of America, Washington, DC. 1997.
Bashmakova, Izabella G. "Arithmetic of Algebraic Curves from Diophantus to Poincaré" Historia Mathematica 8 (1981), 393–416.
Bashmakova, Izabella G., Slavutin, E. I. History of Diophantine Analysis from Diophantus to Fermat. Moscow: Nauka 1984 [in Russian].
Bashmakova, Izabella G. "Diophantine Equations and the Evolution of Algebra", American Mathematical Society Translations 147 (2), 1990, pp. 85–100. Translated by A. Shenitzer and H. Grant.
 

Rashed, Roshdi, Histoire de l'analyse diophantienne classique : D'Abū Kāmil à Fermat, Berlin, New York : Walter de Gruyter.

External links
Diophantine Equation. From MathWorld at Wolfram Research.

Dario Alpern's Online Calculator. Retrieved 18 March 2009